Blanquilla is an island, one of the Federal Dependencies of Venezuela, located in the southeastern Caribbean Sea about 293 km (182 miles) northeast of Caracas. It is a popular location for divers, as well as famous for its white sand beaches, for which it is named. The island's wildlife include local cacti and iguana. The island is also home to feral donkeys and goats.  Its reefs are notable for their black coral, which is used for jewelry and other crafts. The island is formed by the Aves Ridge, a seafloor feature which protrudes above water to the north, forming several other islands. Has an area of 64.53 km2

In 2014, assertions made by the Hong Kong media that Venezuela was considering transferring ownership of Blanquilla island to China in exchange for the forgiveness of its $50 billion in debt were denied by the Chinese government.

See also
Federal Dependencies of Venezuela
List of marine molluscs of Venezuela
List of Poriferans of Venezuela

References

Federal Dependencies of Venezuela
Venezuelan islands of the Leeward Antilles